Kimo Proudfoot is an American director of music videos and concert films.

Born in Honolulu, Hawaii, Proudfoot has directed videos for several artists & groups such as Fort Minor ("Remember the Name"), Soulfly ("Roots Bloody Roots"), No Warning ("Bad Timing"), and Jay-Z & Linkin Park ("Numb/Encore"). He has also directed the concert film Live in Texas covering Linkin Park's appearance on their Summer Sanitarium Tour in 2003.

References

External links
 

American music video directors
Living people
Artists from Honolulu
Film directors from Hawaii
Year of birth missing (living people)